Tropidosaura montana, also known commonly as the common  mountain lizard and the green-striped mountain lizard, is a species of lizard in the family Lacertidae. The species is endemic to South Africa. There are three recognized subspecies.

Habitat
The preferred natural habitats of T. montana are grassland and shrubland.

Description
Compared to other species of its genus, the head is shorter, and the tail is longer.

Behavior
T. montana is terrestrial.

Reproduction
T. montana is oviparous. An adult female may lay a clutch of 4–5 eggs, each egg measuring on average 10.5 x 6.5 mm (0.41 x 0.26  in). Eggs are laid in November and hatch in a little more than a month.

Subspecies
Three subspecies are recognized as being valid, including the nominotypical subspecies.
Tropidosaura montana montana 
Tropidosaura montana natalensis 
Tropidosaura montana rangeri 

Nota bene: A trinomial authority in parentheses indicates that the subspecies was originally described in a genus other than Tropidosaura.

Etymology
The subspecific name, rangeri, is in honor of Gordon Ranger who collected the holotype.

References

Further reading
Duméril AMC, Bibron G (1839). Erpétologie générale ou Histoire naturelle complète des Reptiles. Tome cinquième [Volume 5]. Paris: Roret. viii + 854 pp. (Tropidosaura montana, new combination, pp. 172–173). (in French).
FitzSimons VFM (1947). "Descriptions of New Species and Subspecies of Reptiles and Amphibians from Natal, together with Notes on some little known Species". Annals of the Natal Museum, Pietermaritzburg 11 (1): 111–137. (Tropidosaura montana natalensis, new subspecies).
Gray JE (1831). "A Synopsis of the Species of the Class Reptilia". pp. 1–110. In: Griffith E (1831). The Animal Kingdom arranged in Conformity with its Organization by the Baron Cuvier, Member of the Institute of France, &c. &c. &c., with additional Descriptions of all the Species hitherto named, and of many not before noticed, Volume the Ninth. London: Whittaker, Treacher and Co. 481 pp. + supplement, 110 pp. ("Lacerta (Tropidosaurus) Montanus ", new species, p. 35 of supplement).
Gray JE (1845). Catalogue of the Specimens of Lizards in the Collection of the British Museum. London: Trustees of the British Museum. (Edward Newman, printer). xxviii + 289 pp. (Tropidosaura montana, p. 35).
Hewitt J (1926). "Some New or Little-known Reptiles and Batrachians from South Africa". Annals of the South African Museum 20: 473–490 + Plates XLIV–XLV. (Tropidosaura montana rangeri, new subspecies, pp. 485–486 + Plate XLIV, figure 3).

Tropidosaura
Reptiles described in 1831
Endemic fauna of South Africa
Taxa named by John Edward Gray